

Appointed governors
Yamaoka Tesshū 1871
Yamaguchi Tadasada 1872
Nomura Motosuke 1872
Toru Watanabe 1872-1873
Seki Shinpei 1873-1875
Unknown 1875-1877
Tatsutaro Nomura 1877-1880
Hitomi Katsutaro 1880-1885
Shima 1885-1886
Sadanori Yasuda 1886-1891
Shoichiro Ishii 1891-1892
Nobuaki Makino 1892-1893
Chikaaki Takasaki 1893-1896
Egi Kazuyuki 1896-1897
Motohiro Onoda 1897-1898
Kiyoshi Honba 1898-1899
Fumi Kashiwada 1899-1900
Kono Chuzo 1900-1903
Teru Terahara 1903-1906
Otsuka 1906-1907
Mori Masataka 1907-1908
Keisuke Sakanaka 1912-1917
Yūichirō Chikaraishi 1917-1921
Genjiro Moriya 1921-1923
Shohei Fujinuma 1923-1924
Tsugino Daisaburo 1924-1925
Kaiichiro Suematsu 1925-1926
Kihachiro Ito 1926-1927
Sanosuke 1927
Jiro Morioka 1927-1929
Shozo Ushijima 1929-1931
Tanaka 1931
Seikichi Kimishima 1931-1932
Abe Kashichi 1932-1935
Ando Kyoushirou 1935-1937
Nobuo Hayashi 1937-1938
Shigeru Hamaza 1938-1939
Tokitsugi Yoshinaga 1939-1941
Kanichi Naito 1941-1942
Tsujiyama 1942-1943
Sieve Yoshimi 1943-1944
Hisashi Imai 1944-1945
Masami Hashimoto 1945

Elected governors
Yōji Tomosue 1945-1959
Nirō Iwakami 1959-1975
Fujio Takeuchi 1975-1993
Masaru Hashimoto 1993-2017
Kazuhiko Ōigawa 2017-

 
Ibaraki Prefecture